The Almighty Dollar is a 1916 American silent drama film directed by Robert Thornby, to story by E. Magnus Ingleton, and starring June Elvidge, E. K. Lincoln, Frances Nelson, and George Anderson.

Cast
June Elvidge as Nan Lorimer
Frances Nelson as Masie Lorimer
George Anderson as Dr. Thornton
E. K. Lincoln as John Harwood
Miss Humphries  
Deborah Nanson 
Jack Meredith

References

External links

1916 films
1916 drama films
Silent American drama films
American silent feature films
American black-and-white films
World Film Company films
1910s American films